High energy may refer to:

 High energy physics, a branch of physics dealing with subatomic particles and ionizing radiation
 Hi-NRG, a kind of dance music
 High Energy (The Supremes album), 1976
 "High Energy" (The Supremes song), 1976
 High Energy (Freddie Hubbard album), 1974
 "High Energy" (Evelyn Thomas song), 1984
 High Energy, a 1990s professional wrestling tag team consisting of Owen Hart and Koko B. Ware

See also
 High Inergy